Charette may refer to:

Places
 Charette, Isère, a commune of the Isère département, France
 Charette, Quebec
 Charette-Varennes

People with the surname
 Alex Charette (born 1992), African-Canadian football player
 Benoit Charette (born 1976), Canadian politician
 Brian Charette (born 1972), American organist
 Christiane Charette (born 1951), Canadian radio host
 François de Charette (1763-1796), French chief of the counter-revolutionary insurrection
 Hervé de Charette (born 1938), French politician
 Janice Charette (born 1962), Canadian diplomat
 Manon Charette (1955-2006), Canadian handball player
 Marie Charette-Poulin (born 1945), Canadian politician
 Monik Charette (born 1957), Canadian linguist
 Pierre Charette (born 1955), Canadian curler
 Robert L. Charette (1923-1988), American politician
 William R. Charette (1932–2012), Medal of Honor recipient for his actions during the Korean War

See also
 Charrette (disambiguation)
 Charrette, an intense period of design or planning